Andrey Zhekov (born March 12, 1980) is a former Bulgarian volleyball player and current head coach of Levski Volley. He entered the national team in 1998 at the age of 18. 190 cm tall and weighing 82 kg Zhekov is the former setter of the Bulgarian national team. Club Champion of Bulgaria with the teams of Levski Volley and Slavia Sofia. Zhekov is married and has two children.

In an interview Zhekov says that he'll not be playing in the 2012–13 season.

Clubs
  Levski Volley (1999-2006)
  Ural Ufa (2006-2007)
  E.A. Patras (2007-2010)
  Olympiacos S.C. (2010)
  Galatasaray SK (2010-2011)
  Copra Volley (2011-2012)
  Tomis Constanta (2013–2014)
  Levski Volley (2015-2016)
  CS Arcada Galați (2017)
  Beşiktaş JK (2017)

Individual awards
 2006 World League "Best Setter"

References

External links
 Andrey Zhekov at the International Volleyball Federation
 
 
 

1980 births
Living people
Bulgarian men's volleyball players
Volleyball players at the 2008 Summer Olympics
Olympic volleyball players of Bulgaria
Olympiacos S.C. players
Galatasaray S.K. (men's volleyball) players
Ural Ufa volleyball players
Expatriate volleyball players in Turkey
Bulgarian expatriate sportspeople in Romania
Expatriate volleyball players in Romania
Bulgarian expatriate sportspeople in Russia
Expatriate volleyball players in Russia
Bulgarian expatriate sportspeople in Turkey
Bulgarian expatriate sportspeople in Greece
Expatriate volleyball players in Greece
Bulgarian expatriate sportspeople in Italy
Expatriate volleyball players in Italy